Macuspana Municipality is a municipality in Tabasco in south-eastern Mexico. Its seat is the city of Macuspana.

References

Municipalities of Tabasco